Thomas Lundqvist (born 5 April 1947 in New York) is a Swedish Olympic sailor in the Finn class. He finished 5th in Finn in the 1972 Summer Olympics.

References

Swedish male sailors (sport)
Olympic sailors of Sweden
Finn class sailors
Star class sailors
Sailors at the 1972 Summer Olympics – Finn
Finn class world champions
World champions in sailing for Sweden
1947 births
Living people
20th-century Swedish people